Olivia Tai Qing Tong (born c. 1999) is a Malaysian rhythmic gymnast. She is in the elite squad, in the National Rhythmic Gymnastic Team.

Career

Olivia began rhythmic gymnastics at the age of six.  She has competed in Malaysia and internationally, winning a gold and a silver in the 13th Junior Asian Rhythmic Gymnastics competition. She also competed at the YOG (Youth Olympic Games) in Nanjing.  Within Malaysia, she has won 5 gold and 1 bronze in rhythmic gymnastics, in the annual Sukma (Malaysia's yearly sport competition) competition.

Personal life

Tai is from Kuala Lumpur, Malaysia, and studies at the Convent Bukit Nanas.

References

Malaysian rhythmic gymnasts
Living people
1999 births
Malaysian people of Chinese descent
Gymnasts at the 2014 Summer Youth Olympics